This is a list of events in South African sport in 1996.

Football (Rugby Union)
 2 July - The South Africa (Springboks) beats Fiji in Pretoria 43-18

Football (Soccer)

January
 13 January - South Africa (Bafana Bafana) beats Cameroon 3-0 at Soccer City, Johannesburg, in the African Nations Cup
 20 January - Bafana Bafana beats Angola 1-0 at Soccer City, Johannesburg, in the African Nations Cup
 24 January - Bafana Bafana loses to Egypt 0-1 at Soccer City, Johannesburg, in the African Nations Cup
 27 January - Bafana Bafana beats Algeria 2-1 at Soccer City, Johannesburg, in the African Nations Cup
 31 January - Bafana Bafana beats Ghana 3-0 at Soccer City, Johannesburg, in the African Nations Cup

February
 3 February - Bafana Bafana beats Tunisia 2-0 and wins the 1996 African Nations Cup at Soccer City, Johannesburg

April
 24 April - Bafana Bafana loses to Brazil 2-3 in the Nelson Mandela Challenge held at the FNB Stadium, Johannesburg

June
 1 June - Bafana Bafana beats Malawi 1-0 at Chicheri Stadium, Blantyre, Malawi in the World Cup qualifiers
 15 June - Bafana Bafana beats Malawi 3-0 at Soccer City, Johannesburg, in the World Cup qualifiers

September
 14 September - Bafana Bafana beats Kenya 1-0 at King's Park Rugby Stadium, Durban in the Simba Cup
 18 September - Bafana Bafana beats Australia 2-0 at Johannesburg Stadium in the Simba Cup
 21 September - Bafana Bafana draws with Ghana 0-0 at Loftus Versfeld Rugby Stadium, Pretoria in the Simba Cup

November
 9 November - Bafana Bafana beats Zaire 1-0 at Soccer City, Johannesburg, in the World Cup qualifiers

See also
1995 in South African sport
1996 in South Africa
1997 in South African sport
List of years in South African sport

 
South Africa